Promises Written in Water is a 2010 drama film written, directed, edited, and produced by Vincent Gallo. The cast includes Vincent Gallo,  Delfine Bafort, Sage Stallone, Lisa Love and Hope Tomaselli.

Synopsis
"Kevin is a long-time, professional assassin, specializing in the termination of life. Mallory is a wild, poetic, beautiful young woman confronting her terminal illness and eventual suicide. She reaches out to Kevin to take responsibility for her corpse once she passes, requesting his protection of her dead body’s dignity until her cremation. Kevin’s acceptance of this request causes uncomfortable self-reflection and changes the lens through which he views death."

Cast
 Vincent Gallo as Kevin
 Delfine Bafort as Mallory
 Sage Stallone as The Mafioso
 Lisa Love as Grieving Woman
 Hope Tomaselli as Dead Girl
 Brenda Epperson as Mortician

Release
The film premiered at the Venice Film Festival and was shown at the Toronto International Film Festival. 

The film has never been screened since the two festivals in 2010, and is now unavailable for the public to watch, per Gallo's wishes. In a 2011 interview, Gallo said the film would be "allowed to rest in peace, and stored without being exposed to the dark energies from the public."

Reception
The film was not distributed and received generally poor reviews, with Leslie Felperin of Variety calling the film "underwhelming" and "a disappointment".  Deborah Young of The Hollywood Reporter wrote that the film "is an incomprehensible, disappointing effort in which he (Gallo) receives producing, directing, writing, editing, music and acting credits, so there really is no one else to blame if this story about a man who broods on love and death disappears into the waves almost immediately after its festival outings."

Award

References

External links
Official Promises Written in Water website

Gray Daisy Films
Vincent Gallo Films
Official Vincent Gallo website

2010 films
2010 drama films
Films directed by Vincent Gallo
American black-and-white films
American drama films
2010s English-language films
2010s American films